Monyn is an English surname. Notable people with the surname include:

John Monyn (before 1376–1419 or after), English MP for Dover and Canterbury
Thomas Monyn, son of John, MP for Dover (UK Parliament constituency)

English-language surnames